Paul A. Knaplund (February 5, 1885, island of Saltstrung in Saltstraumen, near Bodø, Norway – April 8, 1964, Madison, Wisconsin) was a Norwegian-American professor of history at the University of Wisconsin–Madison. He specialized in the history of the British Empire.

Biography
Raised on the farm  Knaplundsjyen on the island  of Saltstrung, he grew up as the youngest in a family with 10 children. His parents were Martinus Johnsen Knaplund (1832–1919) and Kristina née Andreasdatter (1839–1919).

Knaplund emigrated from Norway to the United States and established his residence at Ostrander, Minnesota in the spring of 1906. He worked on the farm of Norwegian-American Hans Christensen in 1906 and 1907. Knaplund became a naturalized U.S. citizen at Red Wing, Minnesota on October 4, 1913. He graduated from Red Wing Lutheran Seminary (now St. Olaf College) with B.A. in 1913 and from the University of Wisconsin with M.A. in 1914 and with Ph.D. in 1919. He was a history teacher at Decorah High School in Decorah, Iowa from 1914 to 1916. In the history department of the University of Wisconsin-Madison, he was an assistant from 1913 to 1914 and from 1916 to 1917, an instructor from 1917 to 1921, an assistant professor from 1921 to 1925, an associate professor from 1925—1927, and a full professor from 1927 to 1955, when he retired as professor emeritus.

Knaplund lived in England and did research in British archives from 1922 to 1923. He was the first American historian to obtain access to William Ewart Gladstones' private papers. Knaplund's books, Gladstone and Britain's Imperial Policy (1927) and Gladstone's Foreign Policy (1935) resulted from his study of Gladstone's papers. He published articles in the Canadian Historical Review, the American Historical Review, Historisk Tidsskrift (Oslo), the American Journal of International Law, and Current History.

Knaplund was a Guggenheim Fellow for 6 months during the academic year 1926–1927, when he studied sources in several libraries in England. He married Dorothy King (1903-1999) of Chicago on June 19, 1926. They had two children: Katherine Barbara in 1927 and Paul William in 1928.

During WW II Professor Knaplund helped Norwegians in exile in the United States. In 1953 he was made a knight of the Order of St. Olav.

Knaplund published his autobiography in 1963. It contains detailed descriptions of the conditions of Saltstraumen and its environs at the time he grew up and when he visited there in 1916 and 1923, as well as an elaboration of social identity as a Norwegian and an American.

Knaplund has his burial place in Forest Hill Cemetery in Madison. Upon his death he was survived by his widow, his son, his daughter, and six grandchildren.

Selected publications

Articles
 online text

 (See Rasmus B. Anderson.)

Books
 
  
 
 
 
 
 as editor:

Sources
 Bodin Bygdebok, II, 6 A-B, Straumen.  Bodø, 2001.
 Simensen, J.  Fra Saltstraumen til imperiehistorie:  Paul Knaplund, norskamerikaner og historieprofessor.  I E. Niemi & C. Smith-Simonsen (eds.), Festskrift til Randi Rønning Balsvik (pp. 89–105).  Oslo:  Akad. Publ., 2009.

References

1885 births
1964 deaths
20th-century American historians
20th-century American male writers
St. Olaf College alumni
University of Wisconsin–Madison alumni
University of Wisconsin–Madison faculty
Order of Saint Olav
People from Nordland
People from Bodø
Norwegian emigrants to the United States
People with acquired American citizenship
American male non-fiction writers